Mordella dodonaeae is a species of beetle in the genus Mordella of the family Mordellidae, which is part of the superfamily Tenebrionoidea. It was discovered in 1860.

References

Beetles described in 1860
dodonaeae
2. Species Mordella dodonaeae Montrouzier, 1860